The Tuscaloosa Transit Authority, or TTA, is a local, government-owned bus system based in Tuscaloosa, Alabama that commenced operation in 1971. The Tuscaloosa Transit Authority serves the city of Tuscaloosa and also operates the trolleys between the student entertainment districts downtown and The Strip and game day shuttle buses for Alabama football games. The Tuscaloosa Transit Authority is governed by a seven member board, and employs a staff of 27 full-time employees as of February 2008. Beginning in 1999, the TTA's fleet consists of El Dorado Transmark RE buses that are designed to resemble historic trolleys that have been absent from Tuscaloosa since 1941.

Ridership for the system averages approximately 16,000 per month, and the system as a whole has seen a 9 percent increase in ridership numbers for 2008 as compared to 2007.

Routes
The TTA operates seven fixed routes serving the city of Tuscaloosa with each originating and terminating at the downtown Mund Terminal. Service for these seven routes is Monday through Friday between the hours of 5:00 a.m. and 6:00 p.m. at one-hour intervals. The seven fixed routes are listed below:
 VA Hospital-University Mall - Serves the eastern portions of Tuscaloosa terminating at the VA Hospital
 Stillman College-McKenzie Court - Serves the western portions of Tuscaloosa terminating at the McKenzie Court public housing project.
 Crescent Ridge-Holt - Serves the northeastern portions of Tuscaloosa terminating at Holt High School in Holt.
 Greensboro-McFarland Mall - Serves the southern portions of Tuscaloosa terminating at McFarland Mall.
 Shelton State - Serves the southwestern portions of Tuscaloosa, including Shelton State Community College
 University Shuttle-Serves the University and student apartments

The TTA also operates demand response vans to transport citizens without transportation directly to their destination when regular bus service is unavailable.

Former routes
 Northport Route - In December 2001, the Northport City Council approved an expansion of TTA bus service into Northport. The route served the areas between Druid City Hospital Northport and downtown. With service commencing in January 2002, the route was discontinued by the mid 2000s.
 Blue & Yellow Routes - The TTA operated a two line shuttle service on the University of Alabama campus beginning in the early 2000s. The service was never fully utilized by the student body due to limited service and a lack of promotion. The service was discontinued by 2007 with the opening of the University operated campus shuttle, the CrimsonRide.

References

External links
 

Bus transportation in Alabama
Transportation in Tuscaloosa, Alabama
Transit agencies in Alabama